Idopterum ovale is a moth of the subfamily Arctiinae. It was described by George Hampson in 1894. It is found in Myanmar.

References

 

Lithosiini
Moths described in 1894